Real County is a county located on the Edwards Plateau in the U.S. state of Texas. As of the 2020 census, its population was 2,758. The county seat is Leakey. The county is named for Julius Real (1860–1944), a former member of the Texas State Senate. The Alto Frio Baptist Encampment is located in an isolated area of Real County southeast of Leakey.

History

 1762-1771 Looking for protection from Comanches, Lipan Apache chief El Gran Cabezón persuades Franciscans and the Spanish military to establish San Lorenzo de la Santa Cruz Mission on the Nueces River. The mission was abandoned in 1771
 1856 John and Nancy Leakey settle in Frio Canyon.
 1857 The original Camp Wood is established on the Nueces River near the site of the former San Lorenzo mission.
 1864 Lipan Apaches attack the family of George Schwander in the abandoned ruins of the San Lorenzo mission.
 1868 Theophilus Watkins, F. Smith and Newman Patterson construct a gravity flow irrigation canal from the Frio River that operates for a century.
 1879 Indians attack and kill Jennie Coalson, wife of Nic Coalson, and two children at Half Moon Prairie.
 1881 Lipan Apaches strike the McLauren home at Buzzard's Roost in the Frio Canyon.  Last Indian raid in southwest Texas.
 1910 Crop farming declines in the county, livestock ranching gains prominence, in particular angora goats.
 1913 On April 3, the Texas state legislature establishes Real County from parts of Edwards, Bandera, and Kerr counties. Leakey is the county seat.
 1920 Camp Wood township is founded and becomes a railroad terminus to transport heart cedar.
 1924 Charles A. Lindbergh lands in Real County.
 1948 Farm Road 337 is completed.

Geography

Major highways
  U.S. Highway 83
  State Highway 41
  State Highway 55
  Ranch to Market Road 337

Adjacent counties
 Edwards County (west)
 Kerr County (northeast)
 Bandera County (east)
 Uvalde County (south)

Demographics

Note: the US Census treats Hispanic/Latino as an ethnic category. This table excludes Latinos from the racial categories and assigns them to a separate category. Hispanics/Latinos can be of any race.

As of the census of 2000, 3,047 people, 1,245 households, and 869 families resided in the county. The population density was 4/mi2 (2/km2). The 2,007 housing units averaged 3/mi2 (1/km2). The racial makeup of the county was 91.40% White, 0.20% Black or African American, 0.62% Native American, 0.20% Asian, 0.03% Pacific Islander, 6.01% from other races, and 1.54% from two or more races. Hispanics or Latinos of any race were about 22.58% of the population.

Of the 1,245 households, 26.50% had children under the age of 18 living with them, 58.40% were married couples living together, 7.60% had a female householder with no husband present, and 30.20% were not families. About 28.20% of all households were made up of individuals, and 14.80% had someone living alone who was 65 years of age or older. The average household size was 2.38 and the average family size was 2.88.

In the county, the population was distributed as 23.40% under the age of 18, 5.40% from 18 to 24, 21.50% from 25 to 44, 28.80% from 45 to 64, and 20.80% who were 65 years of age or older. The median age was 45 years. For every 100 females, there were 97.90 males. For every 100 females age 18 and over, there were 95.70 males.

The median income for a household in the county was $25,118, and for a family was $29,839. Males had a median income of $21,076 versus $18,352 for females. The per capita income for the county was $14,321. About 17.40% of families and 21.20% of the population were below the poverty line, including 30.60% of those under age 18 and 15.00% of those age 65 or over.

Communities

Cities
 Camp Wood
 Leakey (county seat)

Unincorporated community
 Rio Frio

Politics

Education
School districts include:
 Leakey Independent School District
 Nueces Canyon Consolidated Independent School District
 Utopia Independent School District
 Uvalde Consolidated Independent School District

The designated community college is Southwest Texas Junior College.

See also

 List of museums in Central Texas
 National Register of Historic Places listings in Real County, Texas
 Recorded Texas Historic Landmarks in Real County

References

External links

 Frio River Canyon
 Real County Official Site
 Real County, Texas-Handbook of Texas

 
1913 establishments in Texas
Populated places established in 1913
Texas Hill Country